Machangding, established during Japanese rule in Taipei, Taiwan. It originally had training grounds and horse riding activities, hence the name.

Since it is also close to Songshan Airport and was used for airport training, it was also known as "Taihoku South Airport" (closed in 1949).

During the White Terror (ca. 1947–1987), the waterfront area became an execution ground. People executed in the area include Chen Yi. It is now designated the Machangding Memorial Park.

Persons executed here
Chen Yi
Song Feiru (宋斐如)
Huang Wengong (黃溫恭)

References

Capital punishment in China